The 2015 Queen Mother Champion Chase (known as the Betway Queen Mother Champion Chase for sponsorship reasons) was a horse race held at Cheltenham Racecourse on Wednesday 11 March 2015. It was the 56th annual running of the Queen Mother Champion Chase.

Build up
Three of the previous four winners of this race were competing in the 2015 race.  They were reigning champion Sire de Grugy, 2013 winner Sprinter Sacre, who missed the 2014 race due to an irregular heartbeat, and 2011 winner Sizing Europe.

The race
Special Tiara made most of the running with Dodging Bullets always looking comfortable with the pace just behind the leader.  Dodging Bullets took the lead at the last fence.  Somersby challenged strongly near the end to finish second with Special Tiara finishing third.  Sprinter Sacre, who looked in contention with three fences to jump, was pulled up just before the last fence.

Details
 Sponsor: Betway
 Winner's prize money: £199,325.00
 Going: Good, Good to Soft in places.
 Number of runners: 9
 Winner's time: 3 minutes 53.30 seconds

Full result

 Abbreviations: nse = nose; nk = neck; hd = head; dist = distance

Winner's details
Further details of the winner, Dodging Bullets 
 Sex: Gelding
 Foaled: 16 April 2008
 Country: United Kingdom
 Sire: Dubawi; Dam: Nova Cyngi (Kris S)
 Owner: R A Pegum, Martin Brougton & Friends
 Breeder: Frankie Dettori

References

Queen Mother Champion Chase
Queen Mother Champion Chase
Queen Mother Champion Chase